Kristina Saltanovič (born 20 February 1975 in Vilnius) is a Lithuanian race walker. She now lives in Lisbon, Portugal.

Achievements

References

1975 births
Living people
Lithuanian female racewalkers
Athletes (track and field) at the 2000 Summer Olympics
Athletes (track and field) at the 2004 Summer Olympics
Athletes (track and field) at the 2008 Summer Olympics
Athletes (track and field) at the 2012 Summer Olympics
Olympic athletes of Lithuania
Sportspeople from Vilnius